H.O.S.T. was an influential Azerbaijani hip hop group, based in Baku.

The group's name derives from abbreviations of the classical elements in Azerbaijani language, which means hava (air), od (fire), su (water) and torpaq (earth).

The group was active for five years and released seven studio albums. The group disbanded in 2012, after each member went down his own path, though some have briefly worked together.

Discography 
 Proloq (2007)
 Qarada Qırmızı (2008)
 Qısa Qapanma (2009)
 EP v.01 (2009)
 Biz İnsan Deyilik (2010)
 14 (2011)
 İşıq (2011)

References

Azerbaijani hip hop groups
Musical groups established in 2007
Musical groups disestablished in 2012